In surgical pathology, strawberry gallbladder, more formally cholesterolosis of the gallbladder and gallbladder cholesterolosis, is a change in the gallbladder wall due to excess cholesterol.

The name strawberry gallbladder comes from the typically stippled appearance of the mucosal surface on gross examination, which resembles a strawberry. Cholesterolosis results from abnormal deposits of cholesterol esters in macrophages within the lamina propria (foam cells) and in mucosal epithelium. The gallbladder may be affected in a patchy localized form or in a diffuse form. The diffuse form macroscopically appears as a bright red mucosa with yellow mottling (due to lipid), hence the term strawberry gallbladder. 
It is not tied to cholelithiasis (gallstones) or cholecystitis (inflammation of the gallbladder).

Additional images

See also
 Cholecystectomy
 Rokitansky-Aschoff sinuses

References

Further reading

External links 

Anatomical pathology
Gallbladder disorders